Westphalia is an unincorporated community and census-designated place (CDP) in Vigo Township, Knox County, Indiana. As of the 2010 census it had a population of 202.

History
Westphalia was laid out in 1881, and it was originally built up chiefly by Germans. It was named after the region of Westphalia in Germany. The Westphalia post office was established in 1881. Many businesses have existed over the history of Westphalia including a variety store, antique store, hotel, blacksmith, elevator, photo studio, mine supply and the Westphalia elementary school.

Geography
Indiana State Road 58 joins SR 67 northeast out of Westphalia but leads west  to Freelandville.

Demographics

Places of interest
Westphalia has a locally owned restaurant, Country Charms Café, a playground, a church, Salem United Church of Christ, low income senior apartments and a post office. Westphalia is a rural community.

References

Census-designated places in Knox County, Indiana
Census-designated places in Indiana